In Greek mythology, Pirene or Peirene (Ancient Greek: Πειρήνη means "of the osiers"), a nymph, was either the daughter of the river god Asopus, Laconian king Oebalus, or the river god Achelous, depending on different sources. By Poseidon she became the mother of Lecheas and Cenchrias.

Mythology 
When her son Cenchrias was unintentionally killed by Artemis, Pirene's grief was so profound that she became nothing but tears and turned into the Pirene (fountain) outside the gates of Corinth. The Corinthians had a small sanctuary dedicated to Pirene by the fountain where honey-cakes were offered to her to during the dry months of early summer.

The fountain was sacred to the Muses and it was there that Bellerophon found Pegasus (as Polyidus had claimed), drinking, and tamed him.

Notes

References 
 Diodorus Siculus, The Library of History translated by Charles Henry Oldfather. Twelve volumes. Loeb Classical Library. Cambridge, Massachusetts: Harvard University Press; London: William Heinemann, Ltd. 1989. Vol. 3. Books 4.59–8. Online version at Bill Thayer's Web Site
 Diodorus Siculus, Bibliotheca Historica. Vol 1-2. Immanel Bekker. Ludwig Dindorf. Friedrich Vogel. in aedibus B. G. Teubneri. Leipzig. 1888-1890. Greek text available at the Perseus Digital Library.
 Pausanias, Description of Greece with an English Translation by W.H.S. Jones, Litt.D., and H.A. Ormerod, M.A., in 4 Volumes. Cambridge, MA, Harvard University Press; London, William Heinemann Ltd. 1918. . Online version at the Perseus Digital Library
 Pausanias, Graeciae Descriptio. 3 vols. Leipzig, Teubner. 1903.  Greek text available at the Perseus Digital Library.
 Pindar, Odes translated by Diane Arnson Svarlien. 1990. Online version at the Perseus Digital Library.
 Pindar, The Odes of Pindar including the Principal Fragments with an Introduction and an English Translation by Sir John Sandys, Litt.D., FBA. Cambridge, MA., Harvard University Press; London, William Heinemann Ltd. 1937. Greek text available at the Perseus Digital Library.

Further reading
 
 

Nymphs

Children of Achelous
Children of Asopus
Women of Poseidon
Metamorphoses into bodies of water in Greek mythology
Deeds of Artemis